Suthershini Sivanantham (born 20 December 1973) is a former women's cricketer who played international cricket for and captained Sri Lanka and Canada, and played domestic cricket for Colts Women. Sivanantham was an off-spin bowler.

Sri Lanka career
Sivanantham made her Women's One Day International cricket debut for Sri Lanka in a 1997/8 match against The Netherlands, taking 1/16 from 8 overs, and making 10*. She played three matches in the 1997 Women's Cricket World Cup, taking 4 wickets; only Thalika Gunaratne took more wickets for Sri Lanka in the tournament. Sivanantham was vice-captain of the Sri Lankan team for the 2000 Women's Cricket World Cup, and was the captain of the team for a 2001/02 series against Pakistan. In January 2002, she recorded bowling figures of 5 wickets for 2 runs in a match against Pakistan; these are the best bowling figures for a Sri Lankan bowler in a Women's ODI.

Canada career
Sivanantham moved to Canada in 2008, and her first recorded match for Canada was in July 2010 against the United States. Sivanantham took 1/46 from 10 overs. A few days later, Sivanantham captained the team in a Twenty20 match against the United States, making 31*. She also captained the team in the 2012 Americas T20 Championship in the Cayman Islands, a pre-qualifying tournament for the 2014 ICC Women's World Twenty20. Canada qualified for the 2013 World T20 Qualifier tournament; in the first match, they were bowled out for 44, with Sivanantham top scorer with 13. Canada won their final group game against Japan, with Sivanantham scoring 32 from 41 balls.

References

External links
 

Sri Lanka women One Day International cricketers
Sri Lanka women cricket captains
1973 births
Living people
Sri Lankan women cricketers
Canadian women cricketers
Cricketers from Colombo
Sri Lankan Tamil sportspeople
Sri Lankan emigrants to Canada
Canadian people of Sri Lankan Tamil descent
Canadian sportspeople of Sri Lankan descent